The 2012–13 Syracuse Orange men's basketball team represented Syracuse University in the 2012–13 NCAA Division I men's basketball season. The head coach, Jim Boeheim, served for his 37th year. The team played its home games at the Carrier Dome in Syracuse, New York and was a member of the Big East Conference.  This team reached the Final Four for the fifth time in program history.

Preseason outlook

Syracuse began the season ranked #9 in the Coaches' Poll and the AP poll, the second-highest ranking among Big East teams behind Louisville. In a poll of Big East coaches, Syracuse was predicted to finish second in the conference. In this same poll, the coaches named Brandon Triche to their all-Big East second team.  C. J. Fair received an honorable mention.

A poll of writers in Big East cities predicted Syracuse would finish second in the conference.  Triche, Fair and Michael Carter-Williams were named to the writers' all-Big East second team.

Roster changes

Syracuse returned five players that had significant playing time last season (three players that earned starts and two that came off the bench), while losing four significant contributors.

Syracuse graduated two players that started every game during the previous season:  senior point guard Scoop Jardine and senior forward Kris Joseph. Sophomore guard Dion Waiters, who averaged 24 minutes per game in the 2011–12 season, left school early to enter the NBA draft, as did sophomore center Fab Melo, who was a starter before the university ruled him academically ineligible toward the end of the season.

The starting line-up for the first half of the current season featured three players who started games in the previous season: senior guard Brandon Triche, junior forward C.J. Fair and sophomore forward Rakeem Christmas.

Sophomore guard Michael Carter-Williams, who did not start in the previous season, but played an average of 10 minutes per game, entered the starting line-up in the 2012–13 season, along with true freshman forward DaJuan Coleman.

Nine players have earned more than 10 minutes per game in the first half of the season. Senior James Southerland was averaging 26 minutes per game through 16 games before Syracuse University ruled him ineligible in January 2013. The three other players who have been playing off the bench for the team this season are redshirt freshman guard Trevor Cooney, freshman forward Jerami Grant and junior center Baye Moussa Keita. Keita also played off the bench last season.

By January of the 2012–13 season, more than halfway through, Syracuse was playing with just seven scholarship players due to Dajuan Coleman's knee injury and James Southerland's suspension. Coleman was Syracuse's starting center at the beginning of the season and Southerland led the team in three point scoring coming off the bench before his suspension. Head coach Boeheim said he thinks a rotation of seven or eight players is enough to compete.

Previous season's depth chart

Current depth chart

The three players on this year's team that consistently have earned the most playing time have been Triche, Fair and Carter-Williams. Cooney has been coming off the bench to spell the guards this season, while four back-line players (Coleman, Christmas, Keita and Grant) have been rounding out the line up. Total combined production from these four players has varied significantly.

New recruits on current team

Jim Boeheim milestones

Jim Boeheim became only the third coach to win 900 men's NCAA Division I games on December 17, 2012 when Syracuse defeated Detroit, 72–68.  On December 31, 2012, Jim Boeheim won his 902nd game tying Bob Knight for second-most men's NCAA Division I victories with a 96–62 win over Central Connecticut.  Boeheim passed Knight to gain sole possession of second place behind Mike Krzyzewski when Syracuse defeated Rutgers 78–53 on January 2, 2013.

Roster

Schedule

|-
!colspan=12 style="background:#FF6F00; color:#212B6D;"| Exhibition

|-
!colspan=12 style="background:#FF6F00; color:#212B6D;"| Regular Season

|-
!colspan=12 style="background:#FF6F00; color:#212B6D;" | Big East Regular Season

|-
!colspan=12 style="background:#FF6F00; color:#212B6D;" | Big East tournament

|-
!colspan=12 style="background:#FF6F00; color:#212B6D;" | NCAA tournament

|-

2013 NCAA Tournament comparisons

Rankings

2013–14 Recruiting

2014–15 Recruiting

References 

Syracuse
Syracuse Orange men's basketball seasons
Syracuse
NCAA Division I men's basketball tournament Final Four seasons